Die Mutter wählt das Todtenkleidchen is an EP by Gnaw Their Tongues, released on August 7, 2007 by Corps-Morts Records. The 2009 re-release coupled the album with the EP Dawn Breaks Open Like a Wound That Bleeds Afresh and three additional previously unreleased tracks.

Track listing

Personnel
Adapted from the Die Mutter wählt das Todtenkleidchen liner notes.
 Maurice de Jong (as Mories) – vocals, instruments, recording, cover art

Release history

References

External links 
 

2007 EPs
Gnaw Their Tongues albums